Syre may refer to:

 Syre (river), a river in Europe
 Syre, Minnesota, an unincorporated community
 Syre, Scotland, a village in the Scottish Highlands
 Syr Darya, a river in central Asia
 Syre (album), a 2017 album by Jaden Smith.
 Syre (band), a Canadian rock band

See also
 Syer (disambiguation)